The men's javelin throw event at the 2019 European Athletics U23 Championships was held in Gävle, Sweden, at Gavlehov Stadium Park on 11 and 13 July.

Medalists

Results

Qualification

The qualification was held on 11 July at 18:27.

Qualification rule: 76.00 (Q) or the 12 best results (q) qualified for the final.

Final

References

Javelin throw
Javelin throw at the European Athletics U23 Championships